Northern Paiute , endonym Numu, also known as Paviotso, is a Western Numic language of the Uto-Aztecan family, which according to Marianne Mithun had around 500 fluent speakers in 1994. Ethnologue reported the number of speakers in 1999 as 1,631. It is closely related to the Mono language.

Phonology 

Northern Paiute's phonology is highly variable, and its phonemes have many allophones.

Consonants

Vowels

Language revitalization 
In 2005, the Northwest Indian Language Institute of the University of Oregon formed a partnership to teach Northern Paiute and Kiksht in the Warm Springs Indian Reservation schools.  In 2013, Washoe County, Nevada became the first school district in Nevada to offer Northern Paiute classes, offering an elective course in the language at Spanish Springs High School. Classes have also been taught at Reed High School in Sparks, Nevada.

Elder Ralph Burns of the Pyramid Lake Paiute Reservation worked with University of Nevada, Reno linguist Catherine Fowler to help develop a spelling system. The alphabet uses 19 letters. They have also developed a language-learning book, “Numa Yadooape,” and a series of computer disks of language lessons.

Morphology
Northern Paiute is an agglutinative language, in which words use suffix complexes for a variety of purposes with several morphemes strung together.

References

Bibliography
Liljeblad, Sven, Catherine S. Fowler, & Glenda Powell.  2012.  The Northern Paiute-Bannock Dictionary, with an English-Northern Paiute-Bannock Finder List and a Northern Paiute-Bannock-English Finder List.  Salt Lake City:  University of Utah Press. 
Mithun, Marianne (1999). Languages of Native North America. Cambridge: Cambridge University Press.
Snapp, Allen, John L. Anderson, and Joy Anderson. 1982. Northern Paiute. In Ronald W. Langacker, eds. Sketches in Uto-Aztecan grammar, III: Uto-Aztecan grammatical sketches. Dallas: Summer Institute of Linguistics and the University of Texas at Arlington. Summer Institute of Linguistics Publications in Linguistics, 57(3) [The publication erroneously stated (56)3, but this has been amended in the PDF made available online by the publisher.] pp. 1–92.
Thornes, Tim (2003). "A Northern Paiute Grammar with Texts". Ph.D. dissertation. University of Oregon-Eugene.

External links
Northern Paiute page, with sound sample
Northern Paiute language overview at the Survey of California and Other Indian Languages
Northern Paiute Indian Language (Paviotso, Bannock)
Northern Paiute resources at the Open Language Archives Community
 Northern Paiute Language Project, University of California, Santa Cruz
World Atlas of Language Structures: Northern Paiute
OLAC resources in and about the Northern Paiute language

Agglutinative languages
Northern Paiute
Numic languages
Indigenous languages of Idaho
Indigenous languages of California
Indigenous languages of Oregon
Indigenous languages of Nevada
Indigenous languages of the Southwestern United States
Indigenous languages of the North American Southwest
Indigenous languages of the North American Great Basin
Native American language revitalization